Marin Software is an online advertising company headquartered in San Francisco. This software company focuses on viewing and promoting ads.

History
Christopher Lien, Wister Walcott, and Joseph Chang founded Marin Software in April 2006. Lien and Walcott are still with the company, with Lien as the Chief Executive Officer and Walcott as Executive Vice President, Product and Technology.

Lien came up with the concept for Marin Software following a brief stint working for an online ad firm in 2005. He realized that search advertisers, especially larger ones, had no viable software for managing their online campaigns. Lien shared his idea with Chang and a former high school classmate, Wister Walcott. Chang had built J. Drew’s website and was a co-worker with Lien at Bluelight.com, Kmart’s eCommerce site, when it launched in 1999. Walcott, who came from software giant Siebel, required a bit more convincing. Alongside Lien, the duo drove up and down California’s Highway 101 in early 2006, interviewing search marketers in Silicon Valley about their experience managing online ads. After a half-dozen interviews, they convinced Walcott that new software was necessary.

In April 2007, Marin Search Marketer made its debut and became commercially available in North America, signing Razorfish, Trouve Media, and ZipRealty. Marin Search Marketer has since become MarinOne. Search, social, and eCommerce are its uses.

Marin Software expanded into the European market with the opening of its UK office in early 2009.

Marin Software shared plans to expand into Asia-Pacific with offices in Singapore and Shanghai in January 2011. This announcement coincided with the announcement of a partnership with Baidu. In June 2011, Marin Software announced its expansion into Australia with the opening of an office in Sydney. The following year, they did the same in Tokyo.

Between 2006 and 2012, Marin raised more than US$100 million in funding. The company reported a revenue of $36M in 2011 and $50M in 2012.

In late 2012, Marin Software's CEO, Chris Lien, remarked to MediaPost that the company would undergo an IPO in 2013. On February 13, 2013, Marin Software filed with the SEC for a $75M initial public offering.

Initial public offering 
On March 22, 2013, the company went public, selling 7.5M shares at a price of $14 per share, raising $105M at a valuation of $425M.

On September 24, 2014, Marin Software announced the launch of the Marin Audience Marketing Suite. (MAMS). On June 12, 2018, Marin launched MarinOne, its next-generation advertising platform for advertisers and agencies, at SMX Advanced in Seattle.

Acquisitions 
The following is a list of acquisitions by Marin Software:
Perfect Audience (June 2014)
Social Moov (February 2015)

Funding

Marin Software raised $105M in its IPO – March 22, 2013
Marin Software received $30M in Series F funding (Temasek, Benchmark Capital, Crosslink Capital, DAG Ventures, SAP Ventures, and Triangle Peak Partners) – February 13, 2012
 Marin Software received $16M in Series E funding (Crosslink Capital, DAG Ventures, Focus Ventures, Benchmark Capital, and Triangle Peak Partners) – April 5, 2011
 Marin Software received $11.2M in Series D funding (Amicus Capital, Benchmark Capital, DAG Ventures, Focus Ventures, and Triangle Peak Partners) – June 2, 2010
 Marin Software received $13M in Series C funding (Amicus Capital, Benchmark Capital, DAG Ventures, and Focus Ventures) – April 28, 2009
 Marin Software received $7.25M in Series B funding (Benchmark Capital and Amicus Capital) – April 9, 2008
 Marin Software received $2.5M in Series A funding (Amicus Capital) – October 5, 2006

References

External links
 Marin Software Official Website

Companies listed on the Nasdaq
Software companies based in the San Francisco Bay Area
Companies based in San Francisco
Marketing companies established in 2006
Software companies established in 2006
2013 initial public offerings
Online advertising
Digital marketing companies of the United States
Software companies of the United States